In number theory, Firoozbakht’s conjecture (or the Firoozbakht conjecture) is a conjecture about the distribution of prime numbers. It is named after the Iranian mathematician Farideh Firoozbakht who stated it first in 1982.

The conjecture states that  (where  is the nth prime) is a strictly decreasing function of n, i.e.,

Equivalently: 

 

see , .

By using a table of maximal gaps, Farideh Firoozbakht verified her conjecture up to 4.444. Now with more extensive tables of maximal gaps, the conjecture has been verified for all primes below 264 ≈ .

If the conjecture were true, then the prime gap function  would satisfy:

 

Moreover:

 

see also . This is among the strongest upper bounds conjectured for prime gaps, even somewhat stronger than the Cramér and Shanks conjectures. It implies a strong form of Cramér's conjecture and is hence inconsistent with the heuristics of Granville and Pintz and of Maier which suggest that 

 

occurs infinitely often for any  where  denotes the Euler–Mascheroni constant.

Two related conjectures (see the comments of ) are

which is weaker, and

which is stronger.

See also
Prime number theorem
Andrica's conjecture
Legendre's conjecture
Oppermann's conjecture
Cramér's conjecture

Notes

References
 
 

Conjectures about prime numbers
Unsolved problems in number theory